The Tamil Trinity (also known as the Tamil Moovar) commonly refers to the three Tamil composers of early Carnatic music. They were Muthu Thandavar (?1560 - ?1640 CE), Arunachala Kavi (1712–1779) and Marimutthu Pillai (1717–1787), and lived five decades before the Tiruvarur Trinity or Trinity of Carnatic Music. They introduced several innovations that led to the evolution of the Carnatic kriti (song).

References

Carnatic music
Indian classical music
Classical and art music traditions
Indian styles of music